Alice Coffin (born April 29, 1978) is a French journalist, feminist, lesbian activist and politician. She was elected to the Council of Paris in 2020. She is affiliated to the political party Europe Ecology – The Greens, without being a member of this party.

In 2020, she published Le Génie lesbien (The Lesbian Genius). In the book, she makes a case for women to banish men and masculine culture from their lives

Controversy 
After the first round of the 2022 French Presidential Election, Alice Coffin denounced "political mediocrity" within the Green Party, and voiced the opinion that their candidate Yannick Jadot "had screwed up".

Biography 

She joined the feminist group La Barbe in 2010 and created the Association de journalistes LGBT along with other colleagues in 2013. 

In June 2020, she was elected to the Council of Paris for the centre-left-to-left green political party Europe Ecology – The Greens.

Publications 
 (fr) Le Génie lesbien (The Lesbian Genius), Grasset, 2020

References 

 

1978 births
Living people
Politicians from Toulouse
French journalists
French women journalists
Europe Ecology – The Greens politicians
Lesbian politicians
French LGBT politicians
French lesbian writers
Councillors of Paris
Writers from Toulouse
Fulbright alumni